The 1989 KFK competitions in Ukraine were part of the 1989 Soviet KFK competitions that were conducted in the Soviet Union. It was 25th season of the KFK in Ukraine since its introduction in 1964. The winner eventually qualified to the 1990 Soviet Second League B.

Group 1 

Notes

Group 2 

Notes

Group 3 

Notes

Group 4 

Notes

Group 5 

Notes

Group 6 

Notes

Final

External links
 ukr-football.org.ua

Ukrainian Football Amateur League seasons
Amateur